George Lennard Jones (born Lockerbie, 11 February 1907 – died 17 June 1954) was a Scottish first-class cricketer. Jones was a right-handed batsman.

Jones made his debut in county cricket for Dorset in the 1925 Minor Counties Championship against Monmouthshire. Jones played regularly for Dorset from 1925 to 1927. Thereafter, Jones represented the county in 1931, 1933 and 1934, playing his last match for Dorset against Oxfordshire.

Jones made his first-class debut for Hampshire in the 1937 County Championship against Gloucestershire. Jones played nine first-class matches for Hampshire in 1937, with his final first-class appearance coming against the touring New Zealanders, where Jones made his highest first-class score of 37*.

Jones died at Aston Reynold, Shropshire on 17 June 1954.

External links
George Jones at Cricinfo
George Jones at CricketArchive

1907 births
1953 deaths
People from Lockerbie
Scottish cricketers
Dorset cricketers
Hampshire cricketers
Sportspeople from Dumfries and Galloway